Luigi Francis "Shorty" Rossi (born February 10, 1969) is the former star of Pit Boss, a reality series (now cancelled) on Animal Planet.  He is also the owner and talent manager of Shortywood Productions, a company that works with little people in the entertainment industry and Shorty's Rescue, an organization set up for Pit Bull rescue (which is no longer in service).

Life and career
Rossi was born in Los Angeles, California. He was raised by his parents, also little people. During his childhood, he lived in two very disparate neighborhoods: the San Fernando Valley, a wealthy area in  Greater Los Angeles, and Nickerson Gardens Housing Projects in Watts, a poor area in South Central Los Angeles, where he lived with a family friend to avoid conflict at home. By the age of 15, he was living on his own.

In 1987, Rossi graduated from Fremont High School. He joined the neighborhood Blood gang while living there. That year, he was involved in a gang-related shooting and convicted of felonies including attempted murder and assault with a deadly weapon. He was sent to the California Youth Authority and was later transferred to Folsom State Prison to serve a total sentence of 10 years, 10 months and 10 days.

Looking for a fresh start, Rossi turned to entertainment, soon learning he could earn good money as a little person in show business. His first job in the industry was at Universal Studios Hollywood, where he was "Alvin" for an Alvin and the Chipmunks stage show. Since then, he has appeared in many commercials and movies, the latter including The Grinch, with Jim Carrey; The Kid, with Bruce Willis. He has also appeared on dozens of TV shows and has performed in theater for years. In 2000, Rossi founded a company, Shortywood Productions, to provide little people entertainers for all types of shows, private parties and corporate events, and to manage their careers.

Since owning his first pit bull terrier at the age of 14, Rossi has championed the breed. This led him to form Shorty's Pit Bull Rescue, a second business that rescues, rehabilitates and places neglected and abused pit bulls in new homes. It also aims to restore the reputation of the breed through education, activism and positive pit bull involvement in the community. The dogs have been featured in student and short films as well as public-service commercials and  print ads. The group does volunteer work by visiting nursing homes, schools, functions and hospitals. It caught the attention of cable TV network Animal Planet, leading to its continuing series "Pit Boss".

After injuring himself in a stunt, Rossi became interested in service animal training. One of his pit bulls has been involved in the Americans with Disabilities Act community ever since. At present two of his dogs are registered service animals, with one in training.

Shorty has written a tell-all memoir titled Four Feet Tall and Rising, which was released in 2012.

Other legal troubles
During the filming of the 3rd-season premiere of Pit Boss, Shorty Rossi was arrested for breaking and entering after rescuing three neglected pit bulls from a vacant house. The charges were dismissed shortly thereafter when the owner of the dogs, who was on vacation in Europe and unaware that the person she had asked to care for her dogs had never shown up, proved grateful that Rossi had rescued the animals. This was shown in conversations with the owner in episodes 1 and 2.

TV & filmography

References

External links
Shortywood
Meet Shorty Rossi: Pit Boss on Animal Planet

1969 births
Living people
20th-century American male actors
21st-century American male actors
American male film actors
American male television actors
Male actors from Greater Los Angeles
American people of Italian descent
Actors with dwarfism
John C. Fremont High School alumni